Roženpelj is a small settlement west of Knežja Vas in the Municipality of Trebnje in eastern Slovenia. The area is part of Lower Carniola and is included in the Southeast Slovenia Statistical Region.

References

External links
Roženpelj at Geopedia

Populated places in the Municipality of Trebnje